Laurence James Hodgson (born June 26, 1932) is a Canadian football player who played for the Edmonton Eskimos and BC Lions. He won the Grey Cup with the Eskimos in 1954, 1955 and 1956. Hodgson also played ice hockey for the Edmonton Oil Kings of the Western Canada Junior Hockey League in the 1951–1952 season, as a goaltender.

References

External links

1932 births
Living people
Edmonton Elks players
Players of Canadian football from Alberta
Canadian football people from Edmonton